Charlie Tonga (born 27 September 1977) is a Tongan former professional rugby league footballer and former coach of the Tonga national rugby league team.

Playing career
As a player, Tonga was recognized as a powerful front-row forward, He played in the NRL for Sydney Roosters and Canterbury Bulldogs, and was noted for his damaging running ability.

In his time at both clubs, Tonga had played only a handful of NRL matches, and spent most of his time at the Roosters playing for the club's feeder team, Newtown.

After a wayward youth and a stint in jail on an assault charge, Tonga rose to become an NRL player and a stint coaching of the Tongan national side. It was in Woodford Prison as a young man in 2000 that Tonga met Australian former rugby league hooker and pastor Noel Gallagher. The meeting changed Tonga's life. Tonga, now a gentle giant, saying that youthful pride was the problem in his early 20s and when he came out of jail he thought his career as a footballer was finished. A stint in BRL Open 1's with Browns Plains in 2000 (where he would win a Grand Final) followed before his meteoric rise from Easts Tigers to the NRL with the Bulldogs in 2005. Two seasons with the Roosters followed, but re-discovering his roots and helping others became a large part of his life.

Tonga won an Ipswich Rugby League title with Swifts in 2011, and retired from playing soon after.

Post-playing
Tonga was later named as coach of his native Tonga and lead the side in the 2013 Rugby League World Cup.

Tonga is a committed Christian pastor and youth minister who is called "Power Up" in Campbelltown, and works with kids at risk.

Career highlights
FG debut: Bulldogs v Newcastle, Energy Australia Stadium, 24 April 2005 (Rd 7)
Played in the 2006 Premier League Grand Final (scored 1 Try)
Played 20 First Grade Games

References

External links
 Profile at sydneyroosters.com.au
 Tonga's road to redemption, Ipswich Queensland Times

1977 births
Living people
Canterbury-Bankstown Bulldogs players
Eastern Suburbs Tigers players
Newtown Jets NSW Cup players
People from Tongatapu
Rugby league props
Sydney Roosters players
Tonga national rugby league team coaches
Tongan rugby league coaches
Tongan rugby league players